Halfdan Nicolaus Nielsen  (26 March 1874 – 21 June 1952)   was a Norwegian speedskater.

He was the second registered world record holder in 10,000 m, when he improved Oskar Fredriksen's record in Stockholm in 1893.

World record 

Source: SpeedSkatingStats.com

References

1874 births
1952 deaths
Norwegian male speed skaters
World record setters in speed skating